Homewood Memorial Gardens is a privately-owned cemetery in unincorporated Cook County, Illinois. Many other unrelated cemeteries share variations of this name. This site may have formerly been called Oak Lawn Cemetery.

Potters' Field
The cemetery has long served as Cook County's potter's field, providing interment for indigents and unclaimed bodies. Press reports in 2011 speculated the cemetery might have as many as eight thousand such bodies, many in mass graves.

Notable interments

 Phil Guy, musician 
 John A. Miller, roller coaster engineer 
 Jermaine Stewart, musician

See also
Homewood Cemetery near Pittsburgh, Pennsylvania

References

Cook County, Illinois
Cemeteries in Illinois